Ayumi Hamasaki Complete Clip Box A, by Ayumi Hamasaki, was released on February 25, 2004.

Ayumi Hamasaki Complete Clip Box A is a DVD box set compiling all of Hamasaki Ayumi's PVs from 1998 to 2003 on three discs. It also includes various commercials advertising the release of her singles and albums. Be aware that when they say "clips", they mean the entire PV.

Track listing

Disc 1
 Poker Face
 You
 Trust
 For My Dear...
 Depend on You
 A Song for XX (TV-CM A Song for XX version)
 A Song for XX (TV-CM Powder Snow version)
 A Song for XX (TV-CM 5 singles version)
 Whatever: Version M
 Whatever: Version J (TV-CM)
 Ayu-mi-x (TV-CM)
 Love: Destiny
 To Be
 Boys & Girls
 A (TV-CM)
 A Film for XX (TV-CM)
 Appears
 Loveppears (TV-CM New York version)
 Loveppears (TV CM 6 singles version)
 Kanariya

Disc 2
 Fly High
 A Clips (TV-CM)
 Ayu-mi-x II (TV-CM)
 Vogue / Far Away / Seasons
 Surreal
 Duty (TV-CM Panther version)
 Duty (TV-CM 6 tracks version)
 Audience (TV-CM)
 M
 Evolution
 Never Ever (Promotional Clip)
 Ayu-mi-x III (TV-CM)
 A Best (TV-CM X7)
 Endless Sorrow
 Unite! (Promotional Clip)
 Dearest
 Dearest (Acoustic Piano Version)
 I am... (TV-CM I am... version)
 I am... (TV-CM 6 singles version)
 Connected

Disc 3
 Ayu-mi-x 4 (TV-CM)
 Daybreak
 Free & Easy
 H (TV-CM)
 Voyage
 Rainbow (TV-CM Rainbow version)
 Rainbow (TV-CM 5 tracks version)
 Real Me
 Rainbow
 A Ballads (TV-CM X6)
 & / Ourselves
 & / Grateful Days
 & / Hanabi: Episode II
 Forgiveness

Ayumi Hamasaki video albums
2004 video albums
Music video compilation albums
2004 compilation albums